{{DISPLAYTITLE:C4H7NO4}}
The molecular formula C4H7NO4 (molar mass: 133.10 g/mol, exact mass: 133.0375 u) may refer to:

Iminodiacetic acid (IDA)
Aspartic acid (Asp or D)

Molecular formulas